Diego García Hernández (born 21 March 1987) is a Mexican football defender who has played for Querétaro in the Primera División de México.

Club career
He played for Atlante until 2010, although he only made one Primera Division appearance for them, against Santos Laguna on 9 May 2009.

References

1987 births
Living people
Footballers from Mexico City
Association football defenders
Mexican footballers
Pioneros de Cancún footballers
Atlante F.C. footballers
Querétaro F.C. footballers
Liga MX players